Nahún Enrique Ávila Amaya (born November 29, 1983) is a Honduran football defender currently playing for Atlético Choloma in the Liga Nacional de Honduras.

Club career
Nicknamed el Zancudo, Ávila started his career at  Olimpia and joined Vida for the 2010 Clausura. In summer 2010 he moved to Marathón only to sign for Platense a year later. He joined Atlético Choloma for the 2012 Clausura.

International career
Ávila made his debut for Honduras as a second half substitute for Marvin Chávez in a September 2006 friendly match against El Salvador which proved to be his only international game so far.

References

External links

1983 births
Living people
People from Cortés Department
Association football defenders
Honduran footballers
Honduras international footballers
C.D. Olimpia players
C.D.S. Vida players
C.D. Marathón players
Platense F.C. players
Atlético Choloma players
C.D. Real Juventud players
Liga Nacional de Fútbol Profesional de Honduras players
Honduran Liga Nacional de Ascenso players